WHGL-FM (100.3 FM) is a radio station broadcasting a country music format. Licensed to Canton, Pennsylvania, United States, the station serves the Elmira-Corning, NY and Troy-Canton, PA areas. The station is currently owned by Cantroair Communications Inc. and features programming from CBS News Radio. The station broadcasts from Canton, PA on 100.3-FM and from Elmira, NY on 102.9-FM.

WHGL has one sister station: WTZN, 1310 "The Zone".

References

External links

HGL-FM
Country radio stations in the United States
Radio stations established in 1975